Edward Hudson (born 26 March 1946) is a British fencer. He competed in the team épée event at the 1972 Summer Olympics.

References

1946 births
Living people
British male fencers
Olympic fencers of Great Britain
Fencers at the 1972 Summer Olympics